Raymond Morris (20 June 1929 – 16 April 2017) was a first-class cricketer who played two matches as a wicket-keeper for Worcestershire in 1958.

Seven of his eight catches came on debut against Derbyshire at Kidderminster. In the same match, he was the second wicket in a hat-trick by the Derbyshire fast bowler Les Jackson in which all three wickets were catches by wicketkeeper George Dawkes.

Notes

References

English cricketers
Worcestershire cricketers
1929 births
2017 deaths
People from Wychavon (district)
Sportspeople from Worcestershire